Marios Pefkos (born 19 August 1971) is a retired Cypriot football defender.

References

1971 births
Living people
Cypriot footballers
Apollon Limassol FC players
Aris Limassol FC players
Association football defenders
Cypriot First Division players
Cyprus international footballers